The 1995 Overseas Final was the fifteenth running of the Overseas Final. With the advent of the Speedway Grand Prix series in 1995 to replace the traditional single meeting World Final which had been in place since the first running of the Speedway World Championship in 1936, the Overseas Final became part of the qualifying for the 1996 Speedway Grand Prix series.

The 1995 Final was held at the Brandon Stadium in Coventry, England on 11 June and was open to riders from the American Final and the Australian, British and New Zealand Championships. Though whereas for the previous four years those who qualified from the Overseas Final went into one of the two World Semi-finals, in 1995 riders qualified for the re-introduced Intercontinental Final to be held in Elgane, Norway.

1995 Overseas Final
11 June
 Coventry, Brandon Stadium
Qualification: Top 8 plus 1 reserve to the 1995 Intercontinental Final in Elgane, Norway

References

See also
 Motorcycle Speedway

1995
World Individual